Still Life (translit. Tabiate bijan) is a 1974 Iranian film directed by Sohrab Shahid-Saless. It was entered into the 24th Berlin International Film Festival, where it won the Silver Bear.

Cast
 Zadour Bonyadi - Mohamad Sardari
 Mohammed Kani
 Hibibollah Safarian
 Habib Safaryan
 Zahra Yazdani

Plot
For more than three decades, aging Iranian Mohamad Sardari (Zadour Bonyadi) has worked as a crossing guard at a desolate train station. Through the years, Mohamad has done little to stifle the loneliness and boredom inherent in the job. Meanwhile, back at his family home, life is similarly uneventful: Mohamad's wife passes the time sewing night and day, especially since the couple's son left to join the army. As time passes, Mohamad mechanically continues to do his duty.

References

External links

1974 films
1974 drama films
Films directed by Sohrab Shahid-Saless
1970s Persian-language films
Iranian drama films